The Roosevelt Protected Landscape, also known as Roosevelt Park, is a protected area in the Central Luzon region in the Philippines.

Location
The Roosevelt Protected Landscape area sits on a narrow valley at the foot of Mount Santa Rita and Mount Malasimbo in the Zambales Mountain Range at the border between the municipalities of Dinalupihan and Hermosa in Bataan. Subic–Clark–Tarlac Expressway (SCTEx) and Jose Abad Santos Avenue (also known as Olongapo–Gapan Road) traverse the southern part of the protected area with the Tipo Toll Barrier that connects SCTEx to the Subic Freeport Expressway close to park's southwestern edge.

Topography and ecology
The park is bisected by several streams, including the Cucubog and Olongi rivers. It is composed of 87% grassland dominated by cogon and talahib, and 13% remnants of old growth forest and mahogany and teak plantations. The park is a habitat for several endangered species and game animals which include pythons, monitor lizards, cloud rats, quails, kingfishers, flycatchers and fruit bats.

See also
 Bataan National Park

References

Protected landscapes of the Philippines
Landforms of Bataan
Tourist attractions in Bataan
Protected areas established in 1933
1933 establishments in the Philippines